CINY-FM is a community radio station that broadcasts on the frequency 97.9 FM in Inukjuak, Quebec, Canada.

Owned by Natturaliit Youth Committee, the station was licensed in 1994.

References

External links

Iny
Iny
Radio stations established in 1994
1994 establishments in Quebec